Rimkus is a Lithuanian surname, being the diminutive of the given name Rimkantas. Notable people with the surname include:

Andreas Rimkus (born 1962), German politician
Ed Rimkus (1913–1999), American bobsledder
Gunter Rimkus (1928 - 2015), German dramaturge
Joseph E. Rimkus (1974 - 1996) United States Air Force Airman killed in Khobar Towers Bombing
Kęstutis Rimkus (born 1953), Lithuanian politician
Lorenzo Rimkus (born 1984), Dutch footballer
Vīts Rimkus (born 1973), Latvian footballer
Vytenis Rimkus (born 1930), Lithuanian painter and encyclopedist

References

Lithuanian-language surnames